Kikuh (also Romanized as Kīkūh; also known as Kīkū) is a village in Panjak-e Rastaq Rural District, Kojur District, Nowshahr County, Mazandaran Province, Iran. At the 2006 census, its population was 106, in 26 families.

References 

Populated places in Nowshahr County